Tanarus is a genus of true weevils in the tribe Hyperini.

References 

 Curculionidae. A Hustache, 1921
 Curculionides des îles Mascareignes. A Hustache, 1921

External links 

 
 Tanarus at insectoid.info

Curculionidae genera
Hyperinae